Jorge de Melo, o Lagio (1460-1534) was a Portuguese nobleman,  Alcaide mor of Redondo and Pavía. member of the Court of John III of Portugal.

Biography 

His parents were Martim Afonso de Mello (son of João de Melo), and Leonor Barreto daughter of Gonçalo Nunes Barreto and Isabel Pereira. Jorge de Melo was married to Branca Coutinho, daughter of Vasco Fernandes Coutinho (great grandson of Gonçalo Vasques) and Maria de Lima (daughter of Leonel de Lima and Filipa da Cunha).

References 

1460 births
1534 deaths
15th-century Portuguese people
16th-century Portuguese people
Portuguese nobility
Portuguese Roman Catholics
People from Serpa